PA Consulting Group (formerly Personnel Administration) is a professional services firm that works with public, private and third-sector organisations. It was founded in 1943 by Ernest E. Butten, Tom H. Kirkham and Dr David Seymour, who used a new approach to people management to increase productivity in munitions factories during World War 2. PA grew to become the world’s largest management consultancy by headcount in 1970.

Today, PA employs more than 4,000 people globally. It has also acquired seven specialist consultancies since December 2017: Nyras, a UK-based international aviation consultancy; Sparkler, a London-based digital insight and strategy consultancy; Essential Design, a Boston, Massachusetts-based innovation strategy and product design business; We Are Friday, a London-based digital service design and engineering agency; 4iNNo, an innovation company based in Cincinnati, Ohio; Astro Studios, a brand strategy and product design agency based in San Francisco, California; and Cooper Perkins, a technology development and engineering company with offices in Boston and San Francisco.

PA works with organisations of all sizes across seven industries: consumer and manufacturing; defence and security; energy and utilities; financial services; public services; healthcare and life sciences; and transport. It operates in these industries from offices across the UK, US, Nordics and Netherlands. It is also a member of the United Nations Global Compact, a non-binding UN pact that encourages businesses to adopt sustainable practices, and the WePROTECT Global Alliance, a network of governments and companies aiming to tackle online child exploitation and abuse. PA produced the first two Global Threat Assessments for WePROTECT.

The company is privately held, with 65% of shares owned by Jacobs Engineering Group and the remaining 35% owned by current and former employees. Staff can buy shares during an annual share-trading period.

History

1940–1950
PA was founded in 1943 as Personnel Administration by Ernest E. Butten, Tom H. Kirkham and Dr David Seymour. Britain's war effort created great demand for munitions and goods, which had to be produced by a relatively unskilled workforce. Butten and his colleagues formed Personnel Administration Limited to provide advice to industry as to how to improve the productivity of their workers.
Like the other three firms that dominated consulting in the 1940s, '50s and '60s, PA was an offshoot of the pre-war Bedaux Company. Bedaux in turn had been developed based on the 'scientific management' theories of Frederick Winslow Taylor and Frank Gilbreth. Butten sought to take the mechanistic and task-orientated concepts of scientific management and add a human dimension to them. The chief idea, along the lines of Douglas McGregor's 'Theory Y', was that by involving the worker in the process of change and a suitable form of ownership, greater gains could be made both by the worker and the organisation.

PA's first assignment was to train volunteer women to assemble the tail gun section of Avro Lancaster bombers, as part of Britain's policy of bringing women into the factories to free up male workers for the armed forces.

1950–1970

By 1964, PA had dropped the name Personnel Administration and was known as simply PA Consulting Group. PA expanded and, by 1970, was the world’s largest management consulting firm by headcount. PA had also expanded geographically, mostly along the lines of the Commonwealth, with its operations in Australia providing about a third of the firm's revenue.

In the 1960s, PA diversified its business significantly by developing the use of the 'newspaper box' advertisement for recruitment.

Butten retired from PA in 1970, having earlier sold his 100% shareholding in PA to the Butten Trust in 1958. The Trust was intended as a long-term guardian of PA's fortunes and an assurance that the company would be 'owned by the employees'.

1970–1992

During this period, PA found success in advising companies on potential applications of technology to business issues. This led to them building technology centres in Melbourn, UK, and Princeton, USA.

Towards the end of the '80s, after an upsurge in the industry, PA's management decided it wanted to take the firm public. The Butten Trust, after an application to the courts in the UK, agreed to give 15% of its shares to its employees as part of a long-term plan to float. However, the company suffered in the subsequent consulting industry downturn of 1989 to 1992 and changed its strategy to one of staff ownership.

1992–2015

Between 1991 and 1994, PA reduced its workforce by almost half. In 1992, Jon Moynihan was appointed as chief executive of PA, with a remit to turn the company around. With a new strategy, aggressive cost-cutting and an industry upturn, the turnaround succeeded and, in 1995, PA made record profits.

Jeremy Asher became group CEO in 1998 and, during his three-year tenure, PA grew from about 2,500 staff to just under 4,000. The firm expanded significantly in the United States through the acquisition of Hagler Bailly Inc. in 2000 for around $96 million in cash.

PA revenues suffered during the consulting recession of 2001-2004, but saw a significant recovery between 2004 and 2006. This helped it to increase its focus on ventures, with 50% of PA's return to its main shareholder between 2002 and 2006 coming from non-consulting activities. This included the sale of a number of subsidiaries including UbiNetics, Volume Product Technology and Meridica. By 2005, the company was ranked 8th in the Sunday Times' list of Britain's biggest mid-market private firms.

Government figures released in 2010 showed that PA was the second largest beneficiary of UK Government contracts to consulting firms, receiving £11million over the first year of the coalition. It has gained publicity for its work on analysing what it has called the zombie economy. Other work includes its annual survey of opinion in higher education,  and ongoing technological innovations, including a new type of round kitchen towel.

On 31 December 2013, Jon Moynihan retired as executive chairman, and was replaced by Marcus Agius, the former chairman of Barclays Bank. In March 2014 the company launched a new logo (the third in its history), a new visual identity and redesigned website. Also in March 2014, Health Select Committee member Sarah Wollaston MP questioned PA Consulting's uploading of a pseudonymised extract of Hospital Episode Statistics to Google BigQuery. The Health and Social Care Information Centre confirmed that PA had used the data in accordance with the information sharing agreement in place.

2015–present

In 2015, The Carlyle Group bought a majority stake in the company, giving it a value of USD $1 billion.

In October 2017, PA started acting on its plans for rapid expansion by relocating its global corporate headquarters. The firm moved from its 25-year home of 123 Buckingham Palace Road, London, to newly built offices at 10 Bressenden Place, taking over two floors of the office block in Westminster.

Then, in December 2017, the firm acquired Nyras, a UK-based international aviation consultancy. At the time, Nyras was the only consultancy in the air transport industry authorised by the Financial Conduct Authority to undertake commercial and transactional advisory services in the aviation sector.

In April 2018, PA's Chairman, Marcus Agius, announced he would step down and assume the role of Deputy Chairman, with John Alexander replacing him. Alexander made the move from environmental and sustainability consultancy ERM, where he took the company through two rounds of private equity funding and grew the enterprise value from US$525 million to US$1.75 billion. The next month, PA bought London-based Sparkler, a leading digital insight and strategy consultancy that works with the likes of Microsoft, Diageo and Uber.

By October 2018, the consultancy expanded its acquisitions into the United States, acquiring innovation strategy and product design business Essential Design. Based in Boston, Massachusetts, the company has helped Woodford Reserve bourbon to strengthen its brand and designed the Hydrow connected home rowing machine.

In December 2018, PA bought another London-based company, the digital service design and engineering agency We Are Friday. They brought with them high-profile digital clients like HSBC, Nuffield Health and the British Red Cross. In the same month, PA also announced it was appointing a new head of its Americas business, Ken Toombs, to drive rapid expansion in the United States. He brought 30 years’ experience in management consulting and moved to PA from his role as the Global Head of Infosys Consulting.

Then, in June 2019, PA looked again to the US and acquired 4iNNo, an innovation company based in Cincinnati, Ohio. One year later, PA acquired San Francisco-based Astro Studios, a brand strategy and product design agency that works with the likes of Nike, Bose and Facebook.

Most recently, in November 2020, PA acquired San Francisco- and Boston-based Cooper Perkins, a technology development and engineering company.

The group announced Ken Toombs as CEO in October 2020, following on from Alan Middleton who stepped down after 13 years as CEO of the consultancy.

In November 2020, PA’s Board announced its recommendation to accept a proposal by Jacobs Engineering Group to acquire a 65% stake in PA. Following a vote by PA shareholders and UK Court approval, the deal was finalised on 2 March 2021, valuing PA at £1.825 billion.

Since 2021, PA has expanded and strengthened its leadership team. John Cala joined to lead PA’s business in the Americas, bringing experience from IBM and PwC.
In 2022, PA appointed a new Chief Financial Officer and Chief Information Officer, and created new roles for a Chief Research Officer, Head of Alliances, Platforms and Products, and Head of Markets.
Chartered Accountant Will Lambe joined as CFO, moving from KPMG, while Kelly Olsen joined as CIO, having previously served as CIO for the NHS Property Service and having been named in the ‘top 10’ at CIO Magazine’s CIO-100 Awards.
Charlene Li, co-author of Groundswell and founder of Altimeter, became Chief Research Officer. Rina Ladva joined the firm as Head of Alliances, Platforms and Products, making the move from Microsoft. And Tracey Countryman took on the role of Head of Markets, joining PA from Accenture.

Technology and innovation 

PA has a strong focus on technology dating back to its work with the earliest computers in the 1950s. Its Global Innovation and Technology Centre, designed by Richard Rogers and founded by Professor Gordon Edge in 1970, helped create the Cambridge Phenomenon where the city became a centre for the UK’s technological companies.

Innovations developed at the centre over the past 50 years include: the original brushless servo motor; medical injectors that mean the patient does not need to see the needle; a self-monitoring device for people with diabetes that measures blood glucose levels; micrometers; and 4G wireless test equipment. During the Iraq War, PA developed the "Panama System" to protect UK troops from improvised explosive devices, winning the Management Consultancies Association's top prize for innovation.

More recently, the Centre has made several significant advances in sustainability. It designed a prototype electric vehicle charging point that aims to be “as recognisable as the red post box or black cab” with the Royal College of Art for the UK Government; developed the manufacturing equipment needed to mass produce edible water bottles for Notpla; and helped build the world’s biggest battery in California with Vistra Energy.

PA ventures 

PA's venture programme (PA Group Ventures) was established in 2000 to exploit the ideas and intellectual capital generated from its consulting work.

Ventures include a third-generation mobile phone business called UbiNetics that was sold for a total of $133 million in 2005; and Meridica – a drug delivery system company – that was sold to Pfizer for $125 million in 2004. PA demerged its venture arm, Ipex Capital, in June 2008.

Other recent ventures include:

Exacsys, which develops solutions to improve Point of Care (PoC) diagnostic systems. One application of this technology is the self-monitoring of blood glucose (SMBG) to help people manage their diabetes.

ProcServe, which provides a cloud-based procurement system. The ProcServe Trading Network covers more than 17,000 organisations and is used by central government, and the National Police Procurement Hub, as well as commercial sector customers including Orange and Xerox.

Argenti, a business that innovates telecare technology in partnership with local councils in the UK to improve adult social care.

References

External links 
 Official website

International management consulting firms
Management consulting firms of the United Kingdom
Computer companies of the United Kingdom
Companies based in the City of Westminster
Consulting firms established in 1943
1943 establishments in England